Danger Jorber Quintana Guerra (born ) is a former Cuban male volleyball player. He was part of the Cuba men's national volleyball team. On club level he played for La Habana.

References

External links
 profile at FIVB.org

1994 births
Living people
Cuban men's volleyball players
Place of birth missing (living people)